"Jimmy James" is the first song and third single from American rap rock band the Beastie Boys' third album Check Your Head. The song has been described as a tribute to Jimi Hendrix by Beastie Boys member MCA, and contains samples from several Hendrix songs including "Foxy Lady", "Happy Birthday", and "Still Raining, Still Dreaming". The song also samples the drum beat from "I'm Chief Kamanawanalea (We're the Royal Macadamia Nuts)" by The Turtles, as well as a line from Mantronix's 1985 single, "Fresh Is the Word" ("...for all the Blacks, Puerto Ricans, and the White People too").

Song information
"Jimmy James" originally started out as an instrumental track with scratching done by Yauch (this version of the song appears on the "Jimmy James" EP as the "original original version"). Later on, lyrics were written and the other two Beastie Boys, Mike "Mike D" Diamond and Adam "King Adrock" Horovitz, asked to lend their vocals to the song along with Yauch.

However, Hendrix's family, who own the rights to most of his catalogue, denied the group clearance to use the samples (the group, however, were somehow able to keep the "Happy Birthday" and "Foxy Lady" samples in the song, though). Determined to keep the song on Check Your Head, the group re-recorded "Jimmy James" using samples similar to the Hendrix ones. This version ended up being released as the first track on the album.

A few months after Check Your Head was released, Hendrix's family finally relented and gave the Beastie Boys clearance to use the samples. As a result, the "single version" of "Jimmy James" was released as the third single from Check Your Head, and a music video was made for it which premiered in August 1992.

The original version has since been issued on their compilation album The Sounds of Science. The beginning of the album version of the track ("This next one...") is a sample from the live version of "Surrender" by Cheap Trick from their live album Cheap Trick at Budokan.

Music video
MTV and VH1 credit the "Jimmy James" music video to Nathanial Hörnblowér, Adam Yauch's director alter ego. However, on the Beastie Boys' Sabotage VHS tape released in 1994, the "Jimmy James" music video is listed as being co-directed by Yauch (as Nathanial Hörnblowér) and Lisa Ann Cabasa, an actress, and Yauch's girlfriend at the time the video was made. Cabasa directed the dance sequences in the music video and also appeared in the video as one of the silhouetted female dancers.

Formats and track listing

 U.S. CD single
 "Jimmy James" (single version) – 3:05
 "The Maestro" – 2:52
 "Jimmy James" (LP version) – 3:14
 "Boomin' Granny" – 2:18
 "Jimmy James" (original original version) – 3:42
 "Drinkin' Wine" – 4:42

 European CD single
 "Jimmy James" (single version) – 3:05
 "Jimmy James" (LP version) – 3:14
 "Jimmy James" (original original version) – 3:42
 "The Maestro" – 2:52

 UK CD single Frozen Metal Head EP
 "Jimmy James" (single version) – 3:05
 "The Blue Nun" – 0:31
 "Jimmy James" (original original version) – 3:42
 "Drinkin' Wine" – 4:42

 U.S. 12-inch single
A1. "Jimmy James" (single version) – 3:05
A2. "Jimmy James" (LP version) – 3:14
A3. "Jimmy James" (original original version) – 3:42
B1. "The Maestro" – 2:52
B2. "Boomin' Granny" – 2:18
B3. "Drinkin' Wine" – 4:42

 European 12-inch single
A2. "Jimmy James" (LP version) – 3:14
A3. "Jimmy James" (original original version) – 3:42
B1. "The Maestro" – 2:52
B2. "Boomin' Granny" – 2:18

 UK 12-inch single Frozen Metal Head EP
A1. "Jimmy James" (single version) – 3:05
A2. "So What'cha Want" (All the Way freestyle version) – 3:37
B1. "Jimmy James" (original original version) – 3:42
B2. "Drinkin' Wine" – 4:42

In popular culture
The name of the character Jimmy James played by Stephen Root on the television series NewsRadio came from this song.

Personnel
 Beastie Boys
 Mike D – vocals, producer
 MCA – vocals, producer
 Ad-Rock – vocals, producer

 Production
 Mario Caldato, Jr – producer
 Tom Baker – mastering

 Other personnel
 Eric Haze – artwork

Samples
 "Are You Experienced?" by Jimi Hendrix
 "EXP" by Jimi Hendrix
 "Third Stone From the Sun" by Jimi Hendrix
 "Foxy Lady" by Jimi Hendrix
 "Still Raining, Still Dreaming" by Jimi Hendrix
 "Voodoo Child (Slight Return)" by Jimi Hendrix
 "I'm Chief Kamanawanalea (We're the Royal Macadamia Nuts)" by The Turtles
 "Happy Birthday" by Jimi Hendrix and Curtis Knight
 "Rockin' It" by The Fearless Four
 "Beat Bop" by Rammellzee and K-Rob
 "Fresh Is the Word" by Mantronix feat. MC Tee
 "Surrender" by Cheap Trick (live version from Cheap Trick at Budokan) [Used on "LP version" only]

Charts
In the UK, the song charted as a part of the EP Frozen Metal Head.

References

External links
 
 
 

1992 singles
Beastie Boys songs
1992 songs
Capitol Records singles
Songs written by Mario Caldato Jr.
Song recordings produced by Mario Caldato Jr.